Nature, Culture and Gender is a book length social science essay collection that analyzes views that describe "nature" as inferior to "culture". Hence, the authors draw on anthropology and history to critique ideologies that, by equating women with nature, renders the female gender as inferior, while the male, equated to culture is seen as superior. The co-editors of this book published in 1980 by Cambridge University Press are Carol MacCormack and Marilyn Strathern. The contributing authors are Carol P. MacCormack, Maurice Bloch, Jean H. Bloch, L. J. Jordanova, Olivia Harris, Jane C. Goodale, Gillian Gillison, Marilyn Strathern.

See also
 Culture and Society, 1780-1950
 Women, Culture, and Society

References

External links

ISBN
ISBNs are: 
 
 
 

Anthropology books
Sociology books
Gender studies literature
1980 books
Ethnographic literature
Cultural anthropology